The performing arts in Australia are an important element of the Arts in Australia and Australian culture.

Dance

Dance in Australia is diverse, ranging from The Australian Ballet to the Restless Dance Company to the many local dance studios.

Music

Aboriginal music

Aboriginal song was and remains an integral part of Aboriginal culture since time immemorial. The most famous feature of their music is the didgeridoo. This wooden instrument, used amongst the Aboriginal clans of northern Australia, makes a distinctive droning sound and its use has been adopted by a wide variety of non-Aboriginal performers.

Aboriginal musicians have turned their hand to Western popular musical forms, often to considerable commercial success. Some notable examples include Archie Roach, the Warumpi Band, NoKTuRNL and Yothu Yindi.

Pop and rock
Australia has produced a wide variety of popular music. While many musicians and bands (some notable examples include the 1960s successes of The Easybeats and the folk-pop group The Seekers, through the heavy rock of AC/DC and the slick pop of INXS and more recently Savage Garden have had considerable international success, there remains some debate over whether Australian popular music really has a distinctive sound. Perhaps the most striking common feature of Australian music, like many other Australian art forms, is the dry, often self-deprecating humour evident in the lyrics.

Until the late 1960s, many have argued that Australian popular music was largely indistinguishable from imported music: British to begin with, then gradually more and more American in the post-war years. The sudden arrival of the 1960s underground movement into the mainstream in the early 1970s changed Australian music permanently: Skyhooks were far from the first people to write songs in Australia, by Australians, about Australia, but they were the first ones ever to make money doing it. The two best-selling Australian albums ever made (at that time) put Australian music on the map. Within a few years, the novelty had worn off and it became commonplace to hear distinctively Australian lyrics and sometimes sounds side-by-side with the imitators and the imports.

The national expansion of ABC youth radio station Triple J during the 1990s has greatly increased the visibility and availability of homegrown talent to listeners nationwide. Since the mid-1990s a string of successful alternative Australian acts have emerged – artists to achieve both underground (critical) and mainstream (commercial) success include silverchair, Grinspoon, Powderfinger and Jet.

Classical music
The first Australian musician of any sort to achieve international fame was operatic soprano Nellie Melba, in the late 19th century. Well-known soprano Joan Sutherland is also from Australia.

Australia has a considerable history of classical performance, with symphony orchestras established around the state capitals in the early 20th century, as well as opera companies and other musical ensembles. However, relatively few Australian classical compositions have achieved lasting recognition.

Theatre

Organisations
There are a number of major performing arts organisations engaged in the performing arts. There was an enguiry held in 1999, chaired by Helen Nugent, the report of the enquiry led to significant change, particularly in government support through the Australia Council and the then Department of Communications, Information Technology and the Arts.

PAC Australia

Performing Arts Connections Australia (PAC Australia), formerly the Australian Performing Arts Centres Association (APACA), is the peak national body for performing arts centres. It was founded some years before 2003, and changed its name to PAC Australia in 2017.  it has over 240 members, which include arts centres, independent producers and producing companies, festivals, performing arts consultants, agencies and funding bodies.

In 2003 APACA created the Drover(s) Awards, to recognise excellence in performing arts touring. As of 2019, there were two awards: the Drover Award for Performing Arts Centre of the Year, and Drover Award for Tour of the Year. The awards were not held in 2020 and 2021 owing to the impact of the COVID-19 pandemic in Australia.

From 2022, the format and name were changed, to Impact Awards. There are no  categories or structure for award eligibility in the new awardsThe  Wendy Blacklock Industry Legend Award (formally known as Touring Legend) is the highest award, to recognise "exceptional, long-time service to the performing arts industry, not limited to touring". It is named in honour of Wendy Blacklock AM, pioneer of national touring and founder of Performing Lines. This award was won by Stephen Page in its inaugural year. Adelaide-based ActNow Theatre won one of the four other awards given to performers, while Home of the Arts (HOTA), a venue in Surfers Paradise, won an Innovator Award.

Significant Australian performing arts organisations
Significant performing arts organisations include:

See also
Performing arts education in Australia
List of concert halls in Australia and New Zealand

References

External links
RealTime – Australian contemporary arts magazine covering dance, performance, sound/music, visual arts, film and media art